Cyclone Lothar is regarded as the worst European windstorm recorded during the 20th century. Crossing France, Belgium, Luxembourg and Germany between 25 December and 27 December 1999, Cyclone Lothar resulted in 110 fatalities (including 88 in France alone) and more than €15 billion in damage, becoming the costliest European windstorm ever recorded.

Cyclone Lothar was the second of a series of devastating European windstorms which made landfall in December 1999, occurring around three weeks after Cyclone Anatol, which caused severe damage in  Denmark and nearby parts of Sweden and Germany. The day after Lothar moved over western Europe, another intense European windstorm, Cyclone Martin, caused severe damage to the south of Lothar's track.

Meteorological history
December 1999 saw a series of heavy winter storms cross the North Atlantic and western Europe. In early December, Denmark was hit by Cyclone Anatol which caused severe damage there and in neighbouring areas. A second storm then crossed Europe on 12 December. A very deep and sizeable depression moved across Britain on the night of 24–25 December (analysed to have possibly reached a low of 938 mb between Scotland and Norway), this set up a large area of westerly flow into Europe which brought Lothar. This highly unstable situation inevitably meant low predictability, and saw an unusually straight and strong jet stream (similar circumstances were also noted the day before the arrival of the Great Storm of 1987). Storm Martin then struck France and central Europe from 26 to 28 December 1999. At the end of January 2000 two additional damaging storms crossed Denmark and the northern part of Germany.

Forecast

Cyclone Lothar was not well predicted, with one meteorologist later claiming that forecasts could be split into those that were poor and those that were very poor. According to some forecasts, the storm was predicted to pass through the United Kingdom, while others failed to predict significant intensification at all. The strong jet stream that was the chief cause of the instability was well predicted by the European Centre for Medium-Range Weather Forecasts 9 days earlier.

MeteoSwiss found the storm Lothar extremely difficult to predict, as even the large forecast models of international weather services initially overlooked the small disturbance above the Atlantic Ocean which formed the storm. Consequently, the power and extent of the storm was only recognized in the early morning of 26 December, which resulted in shorter warning times in Switzerland. In a number of places, officials failed to realize the importance of the warnings, so they were not passed on to the public as they should have been. It is presumed that this occurred because of the holidays.

The German Weather Service (Deutscher Wetterdienst) was criticised for not issuing a storm warning for Lothar in contrast to the weather services of other countries and private German services, apparently due to a software bug.

Lothar successor
A case study of the Manual of Synoptic Satellite Meteorology featured by the Austrian Meteorological Institute (ZAMG) identified an area of secondary cyclogenesis which brought gusts in excess of 90 km/h to Northern France, Belgium and Southwestern Germany. The system formed in the wake of Lothar, and crossed Europe before the arrival of the later Cyclone Martin. The identification of this secondary area and its frontal systems contrasts with the analysis of the German Weather Service which suggested that solely a 'trough line' crossed Germany.

Impact
In less than half a day the storm tore across France, Belgium and Germany, only finally beginning to weaken as it crossed Poland. The storm's compact internal pressure gradients generated winds which were comparable to those of a Category 2 hurricane.

The Paris region was strongly affected by the storm during the early morning. The Palace of Versailles and its monumental park were considerably damaged (over 10,000 trees were lost within two hours, including valuable specimens planted by Napoleon and Marie Antoinette). Other cultural heritage, forests and public gardens throughout the area were as severely affected by the hurricane-force winds. In Paris, more than 60% of buildings suffered roof damage; in other settlements across northern France, the total approached 80%. Public life was disrupted due to power outages and blocked infrastructure. Besides buildings and infrastructure, forests, such as the Black Forest in Germany, suffered major damage resulting in substantial economic loss.

Lothar and Martin together left 3.4 million customers in France without electricity, and forced EdF to acquire all the available portable power generators in Europe, with some even being brought in from Canada. These storms brought down a quarter of France's high-tension transmission lines and 300 high-voltage transmission pylons were toppled, including 100 during Cyclone Lothar. It was one of the greatest energy disruptions ever experienced by a modern developed country.

Highest winds

See also 
Other European windstorms which brought prolonged high winds to urban areas:
Great Sheffield Gale, devastated the city of Sheffield, England in 1962
1968 Scotland storm, caused severage damage in Glasgow, Scotland
Cyclone Anatol

References

External links

 Met Office, University of Exeter & University of Reading Extreme Wind Storm Catalogue: Lothar
 Eumetrain: Storm Catastrope Atlantic and Western Europe - Case Study 25 - 28 December 1999
  Les tempêtes en France
 Details of damage in France (pdf)

Lothar
Lothar
1999 meteorology
1999 in France
1999 in Germany
Lothar
Lothar
December 1999 events in Europe